Vladimir S. Kostić (born October 18, 1953), is a Serbian neurologist, neuroscientist, university professor and the President of the Serbian Academy of Sciences and Arts.

Biography
Kostić graduated from the University of Belgrade Faculty of Medicine. He is a full professor at the  Belgrade Medical School and Director of the Institute for Neurology. Between 2002 and 2004 he was Dean of the Faculty of Medicine. He is a full member of the Serbian Academy of Sciences and Arts and of other Serbian and international scientific societies.

His chief areas of scientific research are in Parkinson's disease and Alzheimer's disease.

In January 2021, a group of citizens protested in front of the SANU building because of Kostić's controversial statement that Kosovo "de jure and de facto isn't ours (Serbian)."

During the 2022 Serbian general election Kostić supported the Do not let Belgrade drown political organization and the We Must coalition.

Selected works

References 

1953 births
Living people
People from Belgrade
Serbian neurologists
University of Belgrade Faculty of Medicine alumni
Members of the Serbian Academy of Sciences and Arts